PP-116 Faisalabad-XX is a Constituency of Provincial Assembly of Punjab.

General elections 2013
Malik Muhammad Nawaz received the majority of votes. The top five candidates are listed below.

General elections 2008

See also
 PP-115 Faisalabad-XIX
 PP-117 Faisalabad-XXI

References

External links
 Election commission Pakistan's official website
 Awazoday.com check result
 Official Website of Government of Punjab

Constituencies of Punjab, Pakistan